The Plymouth Coastal Observatory (PCO) is the data management centre for the South West Regional Coastal Monitoring Programme. It is managed and led by Teignbridge District Council in partnership with other south west of England local authorities and the Environment Agency.

The South West Regional Coastal Programme is part of a nationwide network of regional coastal monitoring programmes. The focus of the ongoing programme is collecting data on waves, tides, LiDAR, Aerial Photography, topographic beach surveys, storm response and ecological mapping Data is published through its website, and is freely available for public use.

Location
The PCO office is situated on the Campus of Plymouth University, located in the city centre of Plymouth, England.

Creation
The first phase of the programme was set up in 2006, with an initial grant of £7.2 million from the Department for Environment, Food and Rural Affairs (DEFRA). The funding was split into two with £4.1 million used by Teignbridge to deliver, Bathymetric and Topographic, Hydrographic surveys and £3.1 million managed by the Environment Agency to deliver Aerial photography, LiDAR and Ecological mapping. Phase 2 of the programme commenced in 2011 with 100% DEFRA funding, and will run until 2016. Phase 2 of the Programme is solely managed by Teignbridge District Council.

Assets
The PCO has a network of wave buoys around the south west coastline collecting data on wave height, direction and sea temperature. In July 2014 the PCO wave buoys recorded the highest sea temperatures seen for 7 years around the south west coastline. In 2011 the PCO buoy network also detected a 0.5–0.8m tsunami along south west coast of England.

The PCO has four tide gauges situated around the south west coast, collecting real time tidal and surge data. A notable addition to the tidal gauge network was the Port Isaac Step gauge, which was installed in 2010. The installation at Port Isaac filled a 'notable gap in measured tide data along the north Cornwall coastline'

Research and collaboration
After the 2013/2014 winter storms Natural Environment Research Council (NERC) awarded a £50,000 emergency project grant to coastal researchers at the Plymouth University in conjunction with PCO and the Met Office. The project will run from 1 March 2014 for 1 year and assess the coastal response to the extreme winter storms. Collaboration between the PCO and the Plymouth University Coastal Process Research Group (CPRG) is ongoing.

Data collected and provided by the PCO is used by local authority coastal engineers and planners to inform decisions on coastal policy, defence and maintenance.

Future development
The PCO currently employs 4 members of full-time staff. It has close links with the Channel Coastal Observatory, and academics at Plymouth University. Phase 3 of the programme is expected to commence in March 2016 pending DEFRA funding.

References

External links
SDADCAG
SCOPAC
Coastal Monitoring

Observatories
Coasts of England
Coastal geography
Environment of England